Lactobacillus plantarum PS128 is a specific strain of Lactobacillus plantarum, a bacterium of the genus Lactobacillus .

Lactiplantibacillus plantarum is a diverse species of lactic bacterium found in a wide range of ecological niches including plant substrates, meat, milk, as well as in the gastrointestinal tract of humans. Lactic bacteria are gram-positive, oxygen-tolerant anaerobes that have been used in food fermentation for hundreds of years.

Safety 

Lactiplantibacillus plantarum is "generally recognized as safe" (GRAS) status and included in the "qualified presumption of safety" (QPS) list of the European Food Safety Authority (EFSA).

References 

Lactobacillaceae